Nazaré, also known as Nazaré das Farinhas, is a municipality in the state of Bahia in the North-East region of Brazil. The municipality has a population of 28,594 with a population density of 107 inhabitants per square kilometer. Nazaré is within the Bahian Recôncavo, an interior region of the state of Bahia. It borders the municipalities of Muniz Ferreira, Aratuípe, Jaguaripe, São Felipe, and Maragogipe. The Jaguaripe River crosses through the middle of the town. It is sits on the intersection of two Bahian state highways, BA-001 and BA-046.

History

Nazaré was settled by the Tupinambá people. Portuguese settlers arrived in the second half of the sixteenth century. Fernão Cabral de Ataíde settled on the right bank of the Jaguaripe River, and called the settlement the Sesmaria de Jaguaripe.

Economy

Nazaré is noted for its production of palm oil, cachaça, and ceramics. The town also supports a small fishing industry.

Historic structures

Nazaré is home to several colonial-period historic structures, some designated as Brazilian national monuments by the National Historic and Artistic Heritage Institute.

Chapel of Our Lady of the Conception (Igreja Matriz de Nossa Senhora de Nazaré)
Chapel of Our Lady of Nazareth at Camamu (Igreja de Nossa Senhora de Nazaré de Camamú)
Chapel of Our Lady of the Conception (Igreja de Nossa Senhora da Conceição)

The Cine Teatro Rio Branco is the oldest functioning cinema in Brazil.

See also
List of municipalities in Bahia

References

Municipalities in Bahia